Municipalism is the political system of home rule at the local level, such as of a city or town, thus a municipality with its own governing authority as an administrative division of a sovereign state. Municipalism is more than simple support for municipalities in that it supports the primacy of municipalities as a means of enacting political change locally, and by extension grassroots movements to enact political change at higher levels of government. It is an approach to implementing social change which focuses on using the municipality as the vehicle for implementing change.

During the French Revolution,  controlled municipal governments and established alliances between neighboring cities, forming a federation of hundreds of "municipalist republics" in south France known as communalism.

Municipalism has also been used by contemporary political movements to entail more specific ideological implications. Most notably by Murray Bookchin in his promotion of libertarian municipalism, which has caused much association of municipalism with democratic, anarchistic, and socialistic ideologies.

The origins of municipalism 
Although, as an approach, it has been adopted by such diverse political groupings as Catholics, Protestants, liberals, Marxists, and anarchists. It emerged in Europe as something which developed in the socialist parties. In 1881 the Federation of the Socialist Workers of France (a predecessor of the modern French Socialist Party) won control of Commentry. In subsequent municipal elections, socialist candidates and parties increased the number of municipalities they controlled to 70 in 1892, and then over 100 in 1896. Meanwhile, in Italy, changes in electoral laws enabled the Italian Socialist Party to gain its first municipality, Imola, under the leadership of Andrea Costa.

References 

Municipalities
Localism (politics)
New Urbanism
Political ideologies
Political theories
Social philosophy